Sayaji Shinde (Marathi pronunciation: [səjaːd͡ʒiː ʃin̪d̪eː]; born 13 January 1959) is an Indian actor who has acted in Telugu, Marathi, Tamil, Kannada, Malayalam, English, Gujarati, Hindi, Bhojpuri films and several Marathi Plays. Sayaji started his acting career in 1978 in Marathi one-act plays. His performance in a 1987 Marathi play titled Zulva was very well received, and since then he started gaining popularity among the circle of stalwarts. Later, he moved on to Marathi cinema and then started acting in other languages. He also appeared recently in Bacha Mat Bolna Yt  Channel

Background
Born in a farmer's family in a small village named Sakharwadi in Satara District in Maharashtra, Sayaji completed his bachelor's degree in arts in Marathi language, and started his career in 1978 while studying in college as a night watchman for Maharashtra Government's Irrigation Department for a meager pay of Rs. 165 per month. During his service as a watchman, he developed an interest in theatre and his passion for acting drew him to the theater and films. After his initial struggling years, he moved to Mumbai.

Career
Sayaji started his acting career in 1978 with acting in Marathi one-act plays. His first Marathi film as an actor was Aboli in 1995. He did many Marathi plays, among which, his role as Sakharam Binder was highly appreciated. Other hit Marathi plays were Zulva(1987), One Room Kitchen(1989) and Amchya ya gharat(1991). He acted in many Marathi movies thereafter, among which, his role as an Agricultural Minister in the movie Goshta Chhoti Dongara Evadhi was to be remembered. Hindi actor Manoj Bajpai happened to see an article on Sayaji in Times of India and the former recommended Sayaji's name to Ram Gopal Varma.

Varma, who was at that time making the movie Shool, immediately offered the role of Bachhu Yadav to Sayaji, thus marking the latter's entry in the Bollywood. Shool gave Sayaji a decent start, however, it was a Tamil film called Barathi which made his career. Sayaji received tremendous appreciation for his acting in the said film. In spite of not speaking Tamil, Sayaji effectively played the role of Tamil Nadu's poet and writer, Subramanya Bharathi in the movie directed by Gnana Rajasekaran, and was honored with Tamil Nadu State Award for his efforts. Later on, he also acted in Tamil blockbusters like Azhagi and Dhool.

Filmography

Marathi

Telugu

Hindi

Tamil

Kannada

Malayalam

Bhojpuri

English

Television

Web series

Production
He produced couple of Marathi movies. Sayaji helped Nagesh Bhonsle produce the Marathi film Goshta Choti Dongraevadhi. He also produced the Makarand Anaspure-directed film, Dambis(2011).

Awards and nominations

2001:Nominated:Filmfare Best Supporting Actor Award-Kurukshetra
2000:Nominated:Filmfare Best Villain Award for Shool
2006:Nominated:Filmfare Award for Best Villain – Telugu for Andhrudu
2009:Nominated:Filmfare Award for Best Supporting Actor – Telugu for Arundhati

References

External links
 
 

Indian male film actors
Male actors in Tamil cinema
Male actors in Telugu cinema
Male actors in Hindi cinema
Male actors in Marathi cinema
Male actors in Kannada cinema
Marathi film directors
Living people
1959 births
Male actors from Maharashtra
People from Satara district
Screen Awards winners
Male actors in Malayalam cinema
20th-century Indian male actors
21st-century Indian male actors